The Fairchild 22 Model C7 was an American two-seat touring or training monoplane designed and built by the Kreider-Reisner division of the Fairchild Aircraft Corporation at Hagerstown, Maryland.

Development
The aircraft was designed by Kreider-Reisner during negotiations by Sherman Fairchild to take a major share in the company. Marketed as the Fairchild 22 Model C7 the aircraft was certified in March 1931. The Fairchild 22 was a mixed-construction, braced parasol-wing monoplane with a fixed tailwheel landing gear and a braced tail unit. It had two tandem open cockpits and was initially powered by an 80 hp (60 kW) Armstrong Siddeley Genet radial engine. After test flying the prototype the first production aircraft were re-engined with a 75 hp (56 kW) Michigan Rover inverted inline engine. The aircraft was fitted with both inline and radial piston engines.

Variants
C7
Powered by a 75hp Michigan Rover four-cylinder inverted inline piston engine (13 built)
C7A
Powered by a 95hp Cirrus Hi-Drive four-cylinder inverted inline piston engine (58 built).
C7B
Powered by a 125hp Menasco C-4 Pirate four-cylinder inverted inline piston engine (eight built).

C7D
Powered by a 90hp Wright Gipsy four-cylinder upright inline piston engine (one C-7C and 22 C-7D built).
C7E
Powered by a 125hp Warner Scarab seven-cylinder radial piston engine (11 built).
C7F
Powered by a 145hp Warner Super Scarab seven-cylinder radial piston engine (nine built). 
C7G
Aerobatic version, powered by a 145hp Warner Super Scarab seven-cylinder radial piston engine (six built).

XR2K-1
Military designation for one Scarab powered Model 22 impressed into service and used by NACA.
NX14768
Experimentally designed wing added to the 1933 Fairchild 22 owned by Charles Townsend Ludington under the Ludington-Griswold Incorporated company, Saybrook, CT. Test flown in 1944, the wing had a series of flaps and wing tip fins. The design proved disappointing and the airplane was later sold.

Specifications (C7F)

Operators

Colombian Air Force

References
 The Illustrated Encyclopedia of Aircraft (Part Work 1982–1985), 1985, Orbis Publishing, Page 1640
 Williams Aircraft Collection - Fairchild 22 restoration and history

External links

 http://www.sim-outhouse.com/sohforums/showthread.php/17-The-Ongoing-Mystery-Aircraft-Thread-Part-Deux?p=878843&viewfull=1

1930s United States civil utility aircraft
22
Parasol-wing aircraft
Single-engined tractor aircraft
Aircraft first flown in 1931